{{DISPLAYTITLE:2019 TF7}}

It was discovered on 7 October 2019 and with the orbital uncertainty still high after 4 days of observation, it had the rare chance of impacting Earth in less than 2 years on 26 June 2021. The line of variation (LOV) was 730 million km long and overlapped Earth's position. It was listed at the top of the European Space Agency risk list due to its large size and near-term threat. Precovery images from 18 September 2019 were located, extending the observation arc to 23 days, and the object was removed from the Sentry Risk Table. On 26 June 2021 the asteroid will be  from Earth.

Orbit and classification 

It is a member of the Flora family, a giant asteroid family and the largest family of stony asteroids in the main-belt. It orbits the Sun in the inner main-belt at a distance of 1.1–3.6 AU once every 3 years and 7 months (1,317 days; semi-major axis of 2.35 AU). Its orbit has an eccentricity of 0.53 and an inclination of 22° with respect to the ecliptic.

Notes

References

External links 
 Asteroid Lightcurve Database (LCDB), query form (info )
 Dictionary of Minor Planet Names, Google books
 Asteroids and comets rotation curves, CdR – Observatoire de Genève, Raoul Behrend
 Discovery Circumstances: Numbered Minor Planets (1)-(5000) – Minor Planet Center
 
  

Near-Earth objects removed from the Sentry Risk Table